Tsakane Mbewe (born 8 April 1987) is a South African netball player. She plays in the positions of GS and GA. She participated in the 2011 World Netball Series in Liverpool, UK.

References
 Netball South Africa official player profile. Retrieved on 2011-11-29.
 Tsakane Mbewe player profile, Netball England website. Retrieved on 2011-11-29.

South African netball players
1987 births
Living people
2011 World Netball Championships players
20th-century South African women
21st-century South African women